Luarts Lame (born 28 November 1992) is an Albanian footballer who plays for KS Pogradeci in the Albanian First Division.

References

1992 births
Living people
People from Kamëz
Association football midfielders
Albanian footballers
FC Kamza players
KS Pogradeci players
Kategoria e Parë players
Kategoria Superiore players